Machilinus is a genus of rock bristletails in the family Meinertellidae. There are about 17 described species in Machilinus. The members of the genus are active during the day (diurnal).

Species
These 17 species belong to the genus Machilinus:

 Machilinus aurantiacus (Schött, 1897) i c g b
 Machilinus balearicus Notario, Gaju, Bach & Molero, 1997 g
 Machilinus bejarensis Bach, 1971 g
 Machilinus botellai Gaju, Bach & Molero, 1992 g
 Machilinus casasecai Bach, 1974 g
 Machilinus costai Notario, Bach & Gaju, 2000 g
 Machilinus gadeai Bach & Gaju, 1989 g
 Machilinus gredosi Bach, 1971 g
 Machilinus helicopalpus Janetschek, 1954 g
 Machilinus kleinenbergi (Giardina, 1900) g
 Machilinus portosantensis Mendes, 1981 g
 Machilinus rocai Bach, 1975 g
 Machilinus rosaliae Mendes, 1977 g
 Machilinus rupestris (Lucas, 1846) g
 Machilinus spinifrontis Bach, 1984 g
 Machilinus spinosus Bitsch, 1968 g
 Machilinus valencianicus Mendes & Bach, 1981 g

Data sources: i = ITIS, c = Catalogue of Life, g = GBIF, b = Bugguide.net

References

Further reading

 
 
 
 

Archaeognatha